Zaslove is a surname. Notable people with the surname include:

Alan Zaslove (1927–2019), American animator, producer, and director
Mark Zaslove (born 1959), American writer, director, producer, and novelist